Tongue and groove is a method of fitting similar objects together, edge to edge, used mainly with wood, in flooring, parquetry, panelling, and similar constructions. Tongue and groove joints allow two flat pieces to be joined strongly together to make a single flat surface. Before plywood became common, tongue and groove boards were also used for sheathing buildings and to construct concrete formwork.

A strong joint, the tongue and groove joint is widely used for re-entrant angles. The effect of wood shrinkage is concealed when the joint is beaded or otherwise moulded. In expensive cabinet work, glued dovetail and multiple tongue and groove are used.

Each piece has a slot (the groove or dado) cut all along one edge, and a thin, deep ridge (the tongue) on the opposite edge. The tongue projects a little less than the depth of the groove. Two or more pieces thus fit together closely. The joint is not normally glued, as shrinkage would then pull the tongue off.

In another assembly method, the pieces are end-matched.

For many uses, tongue and groove boards have been rendered obsolete by the introduction of plywood and later composite wood boards, but the method is still used in higher-quality boards. Plywood may also be tongued all round to fit it flush into a framed structure, and plywood for sub-floors used in platform framing is often supplied with tongue and groove edges.

When joining thicker materials, several tongue and groove joints may be used one above the other.

"Tongue and groove" is sometimes abbreviated as T&G (for example, on price tags and shelf tags).

Methods
One of the following woodworking tools may be used to produce the tongue and groove:

 A wood shaper (spindle moulder) – a four- or six-head moulder for large quantities
 A circular saw bench
 Suitable hand planes: a plough plane for the groove and a tongue plane for the tongue, or a combination plane
 A spindle router

Tongue-in-groove
Tongue-in-groove is similar to tongue and groove, but instead of the tongue forming part of one of the edges, it is a separate, loose piece that fits between two identically grooved edges. The tongue may or may not be of the same material as the grooved pieces joined by the tongue. For example, plywood flooring is commonly grooved at the edges, and plastic tongues are used to form the joint.

In old sailor slang vernacular, a "tonguin" (pronounced ) can refer to repairs made to a boat of tongue and groove construction.

A "tonguin" can also refer to a small raft made from tongue and groove construction methods.

See also

 Cabinet making
 Carpentry
 Fluting (architecture)
 Gland (engineering)
 Groove (engineering)
 Larssen sheet piling
 Pulley
 Rabbet
 Woodworking joints

References

Joinery
Woodworking